Josip Weissgerber (4 May 1922 – 18 April 1985), was a Croatian Jesuit, philosopher, writer and missionary.

Education 
Weissgerber attended the classical gymnasium in Travnik after which he graduated theology, psychology, germanistics, anglistics and French Studies at the Faculty of Humanities and Social Sciences of the University of Zagreb. He obtained a doctorate in psychology (1970) and philosophy (1972) at the Catholic University of Leuven in Belgium.

Work 
Weissberger lectured experimental psychology, history of philosophy, anthropology, onthology, anthropological philosophy and theodicy at the Faculty of Philosophy and Theology as well as experimental psychology at the Catholic Faculty of Theology of the University of Zagreb. He also held marriage advising seminaries.

List of published works:
 Zvona velike subote (The Bells of the Holy Saturday; Biography of the Petar Barbarić; translated to Polish in 1989). Re-published as Uskrsna zvona (Easter Bells)
 U svjetlu metahistorije: razmišljanja za akademičare nedjeljom u 11 sati (works in metahistory)
 Osnovni zakon svemira (The fundamental principle of the universe, 1967)
 Psihološki aspekti odgojnih sukoba (Psychological aspects of the upbringing conflicts, 1969)
 Psihologija (Psychology, 1972)
 Sir Thomas More – Engleski Sokrat (Sir Thomas More – The English Socrates, 1974)
 Načinimo čovjeka (Let's make a human)
 Antropologija: filozofija o čovjeku (Anthropology: Philosophy of the human)
 Razvojna pogojenost religioznosti (in Slovene)
 Studije za obitelj (Family studies, 1978)

His scientific articles in psychology, anthropology, philosophy, communicology and theology were published in Obnovljeni život, Bogoslovska smotra and Crkva u svijetu. He was a missionary in England, pastoral worker in Germany and Belgium. In 1981 he went in the mission in Zambia where he lectured anthropology, history of the contemporary philosophy, onthology and cosmology at the University of Mpima. He was a missionary in Zaire as well.

References 

 Entry in the Croatian Encyclopedia
 Lončarević, Vladimir. HRVATSKI ISUSOVAC, PSIHOLOG, FILOZOF I TEOLOG Josip Weissgerber – intelektualac svjetskoga formata Glas Koncila. Published 10 July 2019. Access date 3 September 2019.

1922 births
1985 deaths
Faculty of Humanities and Social Sciences, University of Zagreb alumni
Catholic University of Leuven (1834–1968) alumni
Jesuit philosophers
Jesuit missionaries
Croatian Roman Catholic missionaries
Croatian psychologists
Croatian philosophers
Croatian anthropologists
Croats of Bosnia and Herzegovina
Roman Catholic missionaries in the Democratic Republic of the Congo
20th-century psychologists
20th-century Croatian philosophers